Jewfish may refer to:

Fish
Epinephelus itajara, the Atlantic goliath grouper
Argyrosomus japonicus, traditionally known as the mulloway jewfish in eastern Australia
Tandanus tandanus, known as the eel-tailed catfish
Glaucosoma hebraicum, officially known as the West Australian dhufish

Places
Jewfish, Florida, an unincorporated community in Monroe County, Florida, U.S.
Jewfish Cay, also known as Hummingbird Cay, an island in the Bahamas
Jewfish Point, a cape in California